Aiud is a city located in Alba County, Transylvania, Romania. The city's population is 22,876. It has the status of municipality and is the 2nd-largest city in the county, after county seat Alba Iulia. The city derives its name ultimately from Saint Giles (Aegidius), to whom the first church in the settlement was dedicated when built.

Administration 
The municipality of Aiud is made up of the city proper and of ten villages. These are divided into four urban villages and six villages which are located outside the city proper but belong to the municipality. The four urban villages are: Aiudul de Sus, Gâmbaș, Măgina and Păgida. The rural villages are: Ciumbrud (0.81 km2), Sâncrai (0.65 km2), Gârbova de Jos (1.04 km2), Țifra (0.06 km2), Gârbova de Sus (0.52 km2) and Gârbovița (0.28 km2).

Demographics 

, the total population is 26,296 (by gender: 12900 male + 13396 female).

Localities 
The municipality comprises the city proper and the ten villages it administers, in order of population:

 Aiud city proper
 Aiudul de Sus (Felenyed)
 Ciumbrud (Csombord)
 Sâncrai (Enyedszentkirály)
 Măgina (Muzsnaháza)
 Gâmbaș (Marosgombás)
 Gârbova de Jos (Alsóorbó)
 Gârbova de Sus (Felsőorbó)
 Păgida (Kisapahida)
 Gârbovița (Középorbó)
 Țifra (Cifrafogadó)

Ethnicity 
The ethnic composition is:
 Romanians - 16,955 (79.7% of total population for which data are available)
 Hungarians - 3,364 (15.8%)
 Romani - 930 (4.4%)
 Germans - 15 (0.07%)

Religion 
 Orthodox - 76.3% of the total population
 Reformed - 13.1%
 Greek-Catholic - 4.1%
 Roman Catholic - 2.1%
 Unitarian - 1.1%
 Other - 3.3%

Geography

Climate 
Aiud has a humid continental climate (Cfb in the Köppen climate classification). The city is located in the Aiud river valley and therefore has a mountain-type climate. It has a characteristic Transylvanian continental temperate climate.

Education 
The education infrastructure in Aiud is very good for a city of its size. There are many schools, with many students, due to fact that it is renowned as the education hub for the area, with students pouring in from other communities in the area. The first school was opened in Măgina in 1611, with Romanian language courses. Today, the following primary and secondary schools operate in the municipality:

 Titu Maiorescu National College (605 students; 46 staff)
  (1,011 students; 81 staff)
 Avram Iancu Technical College (505 students; 37 staff)
 Alexandru Borza Agricultural Technological High School (487 students; 51 staff)
 General School 1 (1,306 students; 63 staff)
 General School 2 (189 students; 13 staff)
 General School 3 (1,089 students; 58 staff)

Tourism 

Aiud is an important tourism centre in terms of agrotourism, ecotourism and cultural tourism.

Cultural Attractions 
The city centre is historical and is home to many landmarks, such as the Aiud Citadel, City Hall, museums, and churches.

Aiud Citadel 

Aiud Citadel is located in the center of Aiud; built during medieval times (14th century), it comprises many buildings. It is the main tourist attraction of Aiud. The citadel is fairly small, with a perimeter of 350 metres, and it is in the form of an irregular pentagon. The earliest documented evidence of the citadel extant today dates from 7 November 1293, a privilege issued by King Ladislaus IV of Hungary (1272–1290), but local tradition holds that the first stone watch tower was finished during the Mongol invasion of Europe in 1241. Other important events for the citadel: the serfs uprisings from 1437; the conquest of Michael the Brave; the Habsburg attacks in 1704 and 1717; the Christian uprising - Religious war in 1758–1761; the peasant movement from 1784, and the Revolutionary wave of 1848–1849.

The Students' Monument 
Due to its strong educational culture, which dates back to the founding of the city, the Students' Monument (Monumentul studentesc) is the oldest monument in Aiud. It is located in the beautiful City Park, and was erected in memory of the students who fought against the Habsburg invasion in 1704. The monument was erected in 1904, 200 years after the invasion.

The "Calvarul Aiudului" Monument 
The "Calvarul Aiudului" Monument is a modern monument in remembrance of the suffering and deaths during the Communist regime of Romania. The monument, started in 1992, is made up of many crosses (6 metres tall), symbolising the traditions of Romania. In the Communist era, Aiud was an important centre where the elite of the Communist resistance were buried, and the "Calvarul Aiudului" monument seeks to remember those. The monument is located just outside the city centre, in the southwest.

The City Hall 
The City Hall of Aiud is located right in the centre of the city, at No. 1 Consiliul Europei street, close to the Aiud Citadel. The edifice, built in the 1890s, is built in the majestic style of those times, with balconies, statues, decorations and wonderful interiors.

Museums 
Aiud is home to two major public museums. They are the Museum of History (temporarily closed due to renovations starting in 2013) and the Museum of Natural Science. The history museum was built in 1796 and is housed in a historical building. There is a large collection of coins, as well as medieval and pre-medieval artifacts. The collection of the Museum of Natural Sciences dates back from 1720. It is based mainly on zoology, as well as botany, paleontology and geology.

Churches 
Most of Aiud's population are Christian, but they also come from a variety of denominations, including Catholicism and Eastern Orthodoxy and well as Reformed, Unitarian, Baptist and Evangelical faiths. Therefore, there are places of worship for all these religions.

The Orthodox Cathedral is located in the southeast of the city, and is an impressive building with high ceilings and wonderful domes. It was built after the unification of Transylvania with the rest of Romania (Wallachia and Moldavia) on 1 December 1918. The construction started in 1927 and went on for some decades. The architecture was inspired from the St. Sofia church in Istanbul, and is built in Byzantine style.

The Roman Catholic Church, albeit being smaller and less imposing that the Orthodox Cathedral, is still very beautiful, built in baroque style. Also, it is situated in Cuza Vodă Square, surrounding the medieval Aiud Citadel, making the Church very ideal in terms of surroundings. The church contains a large organ as well as stained glass windows which were painted by an artist from Budapest.

The Reformed Church mainly serves the Hungarian minority of Aiud, which played a big role in the identity of the city in terms of education, art, architecture and more. Their church is arguably the most memorable of the three main churches, because it is located right in the Aiud Citadel, and is medieval in architecture style, being the oldest church in Aiud.

Monasteries 
The most famous monastery in the Aiud area is the Râmeț monastery, which was built in the 15th century. Its architecture is classically Romanian, resembling the painted monasteries of Moldavia such as Voronet. In the monastery there is also a museum. In addition to Râmeț monastery, there are also monasteries at Magina and Cicau.

Historical Colleges 
The Bethlen Gabor College, with 1011 students today has a rich history. The college, named after Gabriel Bethlen, Prince of Transylvania (1613–1629), was founded in 1622 in Alba-Iulia, the capital city of Alba County, and it was then moved to Aiud. Later on, it was also moved to Cluj-Napoca for a short time. Today, the institution is located in a 19th-century historical building, and it is also home to an important library.

Kemény - Zeyk mansion 

Center of political life in Aiud in the 19th century.

Natural Attractions 
As well as rich culture, Aiud is also littered with wonderful scenic tourist attractions in terms of the environment. There are also many activities available throughout the year, especially in fishing and hunting. This provides a strong base for ecotourism in the area, as there are beautiful forests, hills and mountains and fresh air.

Accessibility and Transport 
Aiud is easily accessible from all parts of Romania due to its position in the centre of the country and its road network. The city is located on the national road running from Bucharest to Oradea and then crossing the Hungarian border to Budapest. Therefore, most public coach services running between Budapest and Bucharest via Oradea stop at Aiud.

Railways 
Aiud is an important railway hub and is served frequently by CFR national trains. It is located on the main line from Oradea to Bucharest via Cluj-Napoca. Consequently, there are 46 trains passing daily through Aiud (with very frequent connections to main cities), to and from the following main cities:

 Cluj-Napoca - 18 trains daily
 Alba Iulia - 10 trains daily
 Brașov, Sighișoara and Ploiești - 5 trains daily
 Bucharest, Deva, Târgu Mureș and Timișoara - 4 trains daily
 Sibiu - 3 trains daily
 Oradea, Huedin, Arad, Satu Mare, Constanța, Mangalia, Suceava, Iași - 2 trains daily
 Craiova and Sighetu Marmației - 1 train daily

(The number of trains daily indicates trains in both directions. For example, to Cluj-Napoca there are 18 trains daily, meaning there are 18 trains to Cluj-Napoca and 18 trains from Cluj-Napoca, for a total of 36 services.)

Health 
In Aiud municipality, there is a new hospital built in 1993. It has 318 beds and 15 sections. There are also radiology services, 24-hour emergency services and a large ambulance station, making the hospital one of the better-equipped in the region. Nearby, there is also a medical centre with 14 specialised cabinets. There is also a tuberculosis sanatory in Aiud, and it is situated in the southeast of the city. This hospital was built in 1914 and currently has 220 beds.

References

External links

 
Populated places in Alba County
Cities in Romania
Localities in Transylvania
Monotowns in Romania